John William "Jack" Rawlings (18 June 1923 – 21 September 2016) was an English amateur footballer who played as an inside forward.

Career
Rawlings played as an amateur for Enfield, Hayes and Hendon. He also represented touring team Middlesex Wanderers.

Rawlings also represented Great Britain at the 1948 Summer Olympics.

References

1923 births
2016 deaths
English footballers
Enfield F.C. players
Hayes F.C. players
Hendon F.C. players
Middlesex Wanderers A.F.C. players
Association football inside forwards
Olympic footballers of Great Britain
Footballers at the 1948 Summer Olympics